Apollodorus of Telmessus is called by Artemidorus a notable or famous man (ἀνὴρ ἐλλόγιμος), and seems to have written a work on dreams. This seems to have specifically been on the subject of Oedipal dreams. His works are now lost.

Notes

Ancient Greek writers
Ancient Greek writers known only from secondary sources